The men's 1500 metres event at the 2018 African Championships in Athletics was held on 4 and 5 August in Asaba, Nigeria.

Medalists

Results

Heats
Qualification: First 5 of each heat (Q) and the next 6 fastest (q) qualified for the final.

Final

References

2018 African Championships in Athletics
1500 metres at the African Championships in Athletics